The women's 57 kg competition of the judo events at the 2013 Mediterranean Games in Mersin, Turkey, was held on 21 June at the Mezitli Sports Hall.

Schedule
All times are Eastern European Summer Time (UTC+3).

Results
Legend

1st number = Ippon
2nd number = Waza-ari
3rd number = Yuko

Bracket

Repechage round
Two bronze medals were awarded.

References

External links
 

W57
2013
Mediterranean W57